Jana Novotná and Catherine Suire were the defending champions but only Suire competed that year with Catherine Tanvier.

Suire and Tanvier lost in the first round to Anne Minter and Elna Reinach.

Manon Bollegraf and Nicole Provis won in the final 7–5, 6–7, 6–3 against Jenny Byrne and Janine Tremelling.

Seeds
Champion seeds are indicated in bold text while text in italics indicates the round in which those seeds were eliminated.

 Catherine Suire /  Catherine Tanvier (first round)
 Leila Meskhi /  Natasha Zvereva (quarterfinals)
 Jenny Byrne /  Janine Tremelling (final)
 Manon Bollegraf /  Nicole Provis (champions)

Draw

References
 1988 Internationaux de Strasbourg Doubles Draw

1988
1988 WTA Tour
1988 in French tennis